Martin Filchock (January 6, 1912 – September 5, 2012) was an American cartoonist and self-taught artist who was a pioneer during the Golden Age of comic books.  During World War II, he served in the U.S. Army and drew comics for Army magazines.  He also pitched semi-professional baseball.

Filchock illustrated more than a hundred magazines including The Saturday Evening Post, Good Housekeeping, Reader's Digest, and The Journal of the American Medical Association.

At the time of his death at age 100, he was described as the "oldest working cartoonist."  He had had his first cartoon published in 1925 when he was only 13 years old.
 Lambiek Comiclopedia article.

References

1912 births
2012 deaths
American comics artists
American magazine illustrators
United States Army personnel of World War II
Golden Age comics creators
United States Army soldiers
American centenarians
Men centenarians